David Raymond Choby (January 17, 1947 – June 3, 2017) was an American prelate of the Roman Catholic Church. He served as the 11th bishop of the Diocese of Nashville in Tennessee from 2005 until his death in 2017.  He previously served as diocesan administrator for the diocese from 2004 to 2006.

Biography

Early life 
David Choby was born on January 17, 1947, in Nashville, Tennessee.   He was the son of Raymond and Rita Choby.  He had one sister, Diane C. Dyche of Fort Worth, Texas. 

Choby was baptized in the Cathedral Church of the Incarnation in Nashville, where he would later be consecrated as bishop. He attended Catholic schools growing up, and graduated from Father Ryan High School in Nashville in 1965.

After spending one year at Aquinas College in Nashville, Choby entered the seminary at St. Ambrose College in Davenport, Iowa. He then studied at Catholic University of America in Washington, D.C.

Priesthood 
Choby received the Sacrament of Holy Orders and was ordained a priest for the Diocese of Nashville on September 6, 1974, by Bishop Joseph A. Durick at St. Henry Church in Belle Meade, Tennessee.

Choby served as associate pastor at St. Joseph Parish in Madison, Tennessee, administrator of St. Ann Parish in Nashville, and spent three years in residence at Christ the King Parish in Nashville while working at the Diocesan Tribunal. In 1989, he was appointed pastor at St. John Vianney Parish in Gallatin, Tennessee, where he was active in the community and in the local ministerial association.

Choby attended the Pontifical University of St. Thomas Aquinas Angelicum in Rome where he earned a canon law degree.  He served as a member of the diocesan tribunal throughout most of his priesthood. He also served two five-year terms on the diocese’s presbyteral council and college of consultors.  From 1984 to 1989, Choby taught at the Pontifical College Josephinum, a seminary in Columbus, Ohio. 

On August 12, 2004, Pope John Paul II appointed Nashville Bishop Edward U. Kmiec, as the Bishop of the Diocese of Buffalo.  Choby was elected diocesan administrator by the diocesan College of Consultors.

Bishop of Nashville
Pope Benedict XVI appointed Choby as bishop of the Diocese of Nashville on December 20, 2005.  He was only the second priest from Nashville to be appointed as its bishop.  He was consecrated and installed on February 27, 2006 in the Cathedral Church of the Incarnation in Nashville.  The principal consecrator was Archbishop Thomas C. Kelly. Choby chose as his episcopal motto: "That We May Live," a quotation from the Fourth Eucharistic Prayer.  As bishop, Choby was a board member of the Josephinum.

Death and legacy
Choby sustained two falls in his later years.  The second fall in February 2017 resulted in serious injuries that forced him to delegate governance of the diocese to Reverend David Perkin, the vicar general.  

David Choby died in Nashville on June 3, 2017 from infections resulting from his injuries.

See also
 

 Catholic Church hierarchy
 Catholic Church in the United States
 Historical list of the Catholic bishops of the United States
 List of Catholic bishops of the United States
 Lists of patriarchs, archbishops, and bishops

References

External links
Roman Catholic Diocese of Nashville Official Site
David Choby at DioceseofNashville.com

1947 births
2017 deaths
Roman Catholic bishops of Nashville
Aquinas College (Tennessee) alumni
Pontifical College Josephinum faculty
Pontifical University of Saint Thomas Aquinas alumni
St. Ambrose University alumni
Catholic University of America alumni
21st-century Roman Catholic bishops in the United States
Accidental deaths in Tennessee